The 2017 Thai League 2 (known as the M-150 Championship for sponsorship reasons) is the 20th season of the League since its establishment in 1997. It is the feeder league for the Thai League T1. A total of 18 teams will compete in the league this season.

Changes from last season

Team changes

From Thai League 2
Promoted to 2017 Thai League
 Thai Honda Ladkrabang
 Ubon UMT United
 Port

To Thai League 2
Relegated from 2016 Thai League T1
 Army United
 Chainat Hornbill
 BBCU

Promoted from 2016 Regional League Division 2
 Trat
 Kasetsart
 Nongbua Pitchaya

Withdrawn Clubs
 BBCU dissolved team. This team is automatically banned 2 years, recover damage subsidy and relegated to 2020 Thai League 4 Bangkok Metropolitan Region.

Teams

Stadium and locations
Note: Club dissolved during season would shown by grey background.

Sponsoring
Note: Club dissolved during season would shown by grey background.

Personnel
Note: Flags indicate national team as has been defined under FIFA eligibility rules. Players may hold more than one non-FIFA nationality; Club dissolved during season would shown by grey background.

Foreign players

The number of foreign players is restricted to five per T2 team. A team can use five foreign players on the field in each game, including at least one player from the AFC member countries and one player from nine countries member of ASEAN (3+1+1).
Note : BBCU had withdrawn since 29 April 2017. So they had registered their players only first leg.: players who released during summer transfer window;: players who registered during summer transfer window.↔: players who have dual nationality by half-caste or naturalization.

League table

Standings

Positions by round

The table lists the positions of teams after each week of matches. In order to preserve chronological evolvements, any postponed matches are not included in the round at which they were originally scheduled, but added to the full round they were played immediately afterwards. For example, if a match is scheduled for matchday 13, but then postponed and played between days 16 and 17, it will be added to the standings for day 16.

Source: Thai League 2

Results

Season statistics

Top scorers
As of 21 October 2017.

Hat-tricks

Attendances

Overall statistical table

Attendances by home match played

Since 29 April 2017 BBCU had withdrawn. But statistics of attendances are continue counting.

Source: Thai League 2

See also
 2017 Thai League
 2017 Thai League 3
 2017 Thai League 4
 2017 Thailand Amateur League
 2017 Thai FA Cup
 2017 Thai League Cup
 2017 Thailand Champions Cup

References

External links
 Thai League 2 Official Website
Clubs data from Thai League 2 official website

Air Force Central
Angthong
Army United
Bangkok
BBCU
Chainat Hornbill
Chiangmai
Kasetsart
Krabi
Lampang
Nakhon Pathom United
Nongbua Pitchaya
Prachuap
PTT Rayong
Rayong
Samut Songkhram
Songkhla United
Trat

Thai League 2 seasons
2017 in Thai football leagues
T
T